Jobson Souza Santos (born 13 September 1995), simply known as Jobson, is a Brazilian professional footballer who plays as a defensive midfielder for Saudi Arabian club Al-Kholood.

Club career

Palmeiras and loans
Born in São Paulo, Jobson finished his formation with Palmeiras. On 29 November 2015, he made his first team – and Série A – debut, coming on as a substitute for Agustín Allione in a 2–0 away loss against Coritiba.

On 2 March 2016, Jobson was loaned to Santo André until the end of the Campeonato Paulista Série A2. He subsequently served another loan stint at Nacional-SP before leaving the club.

Náutico
On 30 May 2017, Jobson agreed to a permanent deal with Náutico. He contributed with ten league appearances during the season's Série B, as his side suffered relegation.

On 9 May 2018, after scoring the winning goal of the Campeonato Pernambucano final against Central, Jobson extended his contract until April 2019.

Red Bull Brasil
On 10 September 2018, Jobson was loaned to Red Bull Brasil for the Copa Paulista. On 19 December, he signed a permanent deal after Red Bull activated his release clause.

Jobson impressed during the 2019 Campeonato Paulista, helping his side win the Troféu do Interior and attracting interest from various Série A clubs.

Santos
On 16 April 2019, Jobson joined Santos in the top tier on a five-year deal. He only made his debut for the club on 17 October, starting in a 2–1 home win against Ceará.

Jobson was rarely used by manager Jorge Sampaoli during his first year, but featured more regularly under Jesualdo Ferreira. He scored his first goal for Peixe on 3 March 2020, netting the equalizer in a 2–1 Copa Libertadores away win against Defensa y Justicia; it was also his debut match in the competition.

On 10 November 2020, it was announced that Jobson and a further six first team players tested positive for COVID-19. The following 18 January, he was sidelined for the remainder of the season after suffering a knee injury.

Jobson returned to action on 10 October 2021, replacing Camacho late into a 1–0 home win over Grêmio. After being left out of the main squad during the 2022 season, he returned to Náutico on loan on 6 July 2022.

On 10 January 2023, Santos announced the departure of Jobson on a mutual agreement.

Al-Kholood
On 11 January 2023, Jobson signed for Saudi Arabian club Al-Kholood.

Career statistics

Honours
Santo André
Campeonato Paulista Série A2: 2016

Nacional-SP
Campeonato Paulista Série A3: 2017

Náutico
Campeonato Pernambucano: 2018

References

External links

1995 births
Living people
Footballers from São Paulo
Brazilian footballers
Association football midfielders
Campeonato Brasileiro Série A players
Campeonato Brasileiro Série B players
Campeonato Brasileiro Série C players
Saudi First Division League players
Sociedade Esportiva Palmeiras players
Esporte Clube Santo André players
Nacional Atlético Clube (SP) players
Clube Náutico Capibaribe players
Red Bull Brasil players
Santos FC players
Al-Kholood Club players
Brazilian expatriate footballers
Expatriate footballers in Saudi Arabia
Brazilian expatriate sportspeople in Saudi Arabia